This is a list of Sites of Special Scientific Interest (SSSIs) in South Yorkshire, United Kingdom. , There are 35 sites designated within this Area of Search, of which 18 have been designated due to their biological interest, 14 due to its geological interest, and 3 for both biological and geological interest. In England the body responsible for designating SSSIs is Natural England, which chooses a site because of its fauna, flora, geological or physiographical features. Natural England took over the role of designating and managing SSSIs from English Nature in October 2006 when it was formed from the amalgamation of English Nature, parts of the Countryside Agency and the Rural Development Service. Natural England, like its predecessor, uses the 1974–1996 county system and as such the same approach is followed here, rather than, for example, merging all Yorkshire sites into a single list. Natural England produces citation sheets for each SSSI and are the main source of information for this list.

South Yorkshire's geography can be split into different types. The very west of South Yorkshire is part of Dark Peak which is part of the Peak District National Park and lies to the west of Sheffield. This extensive moorland is one of the largest semi-natural areas in England and has broad plateaus with rocky outcrops interspersed with valleys. Moving east the land elevation drops with a transition from the peak district to coal fields. Much of this area of transition has seen urban development with Sheffield being a good example.

The central region, to the north of Sheffield is largely dependent on the presence of coal measures in the areas geology. This is reflected by ancient woodlands, valley wetlands and large arable fields where there is no urban development. To the east of the coal measures is a strip of Magnesian Limestone which runs north to south between Sheffield and Doncaster. This open landscape is characterised by ancient woodlands and limestone grasslands and often has historic limestone monuments. However the light and dry soils are ideal for cultivation which means little of the original habitat remains. In the very east of South Yorkshire the Humberhead Levels dominate, with the area being relatively flat and dominated by the areas river systems. The area is predominantly covered with small fields or areas of peatland.

Sites

See also
List of SSSIs by Area of Search.

Notes 
Data rounded to one decimal place.
Grid reference is based on the British national grid reference system, also known as OSGB36, and is the system used by the Ordnance Survey.
Link to maps using the Nature  on the Map service provided by English Nature.
The Dark Peak site extends into three other counties and so can be found on lists of SSSIs in Derbyshire, Greater Manchester and West Yorkshire.
Incorporates three formers SSSIs: Hallam Moors being first notified in 1955, Eastern Moors in 1964 and Houndkirk Moor in 1972.
SSSI is split between South Yorkshire and Nottinghamshire. 36.7 hectares (90.6 acres) is in South Yorkshire.
SSSI is split between South Yorkshire, the East Riding of Yorkshire and Lincolnshire. 1309.1 hectares (3234.7 acres) lie in South Yorkshire.

References 

 
South Yorkshire
Geography of South Yorkshire
Sites of Special Scientific Interest